Kenneth Roy Daniel (31 August 1892 – 23 September 1965) was a Progressive Conservative party member of the House of Commons of Canada. He was born in Ingersoll, Ontario, and became a farmer by career.

Daniel attended school at Ingersoll Collegiate Institute and Woodstock Business College. He was a town councillor for Ingersoll from 1940 to 1942, then the community's mayor in 1943 and 1944.

He was first elected to Parliament at the Oxford riding in the 1945 general election then defeated in the 1949 election by Alexander Clark Murray of the Liberal party.

References

External links
 

1892 births
1965 deaths
Canadian farmers
Mayors of places in Ontario
Members of the House of Commons of Canada from Ontario
Ontario municipal councillors
Progressive Conservative Party of Canada MPs
People from Ingersoll, Ontario
Henry Laurence Gantt Medal recipients
20th-century American engineers